The 2018 Men's EuroHockey Indoor Club Cup was the 29th edition of the Men's EuroHockey Indoor Club Cup, Europe's premier club indoor hockey tournament organized by the EHF. It was held from 16 to 18 February 2019 in Wettingen, Switzerland.

Rot-Weiss Köln won a record-extending ninth title by defeating Racing Club de Bruxelles 5–2 in the final, Dinamo Elektrostal took the bronze medal and Surbiton and Complutense were relegated to the Trophy division.

Teams
Participating clubs have qualified based on their country's final ranking from the 2017 competition (Host is highlighted in bold).

Results
All times are local, CET (UTC+1).

Preliminary round

Pool A

Pool B

Fifth to eighth place classification

Pool C
The points obtained in the preliminary round against the other team are taken over.

First to fourth place classification

Semi-finals

Third and fourth place

Final

Statistics

Final standings

Top goalscorers

Awards
The following individual awards were given at the conclusion of the tournament.

See also
2017–18 Euro Hockey League

References

Men's EuroHockey Indoor Club Cup
Club Cup
International indoor hockey competitions hosted by Switzerland
EuroHockey Indoor Club Cup Men
EuroHockey Indoor Club Cup Men